The 2021 Central Arkansas Bears baseball team represented the University of Central Arkansas during the 2021 NCAA Division I baseball season. The Bears played their home games at Bear Stadium and were led by fifteenth–year head coach Allen Gum. They were members of the Southland Conference. This was Central Arkansas' final year in the Southland as they will be moving to the ASUN Conference for the 2022 season.

Preseason

Southland Conference Coaches Poll
The Southland Conference Coaches Poll was released on February 11, 2021, and the Bears were picked to finish second in the conference with 247 votes and five first place votes.

Preseason All-Southland Team & Honors

First Team
Ryan Flores (UIW, 1st Base)
Nate Fisbeck (MCNS, 2nd Base)
Beau Orlando (UCA, 3rd Base)
JC Correa (LAMR, Shortstop)
Gavin Johnson (SHSU, Catcher)
Clayton Rasbeary (MCNS, Designated Hitter)
Sean Arnold (UIW, Outfielder)
Brandon Bena (HBU, Outfielder)
Colton Cowser (SHSU, Outfielder)
Noah Cameron (UCA, Pitcher)
Will Dion (MCNS, Pitcher)
Kyle Gruller (HBU, Pitcher)
Conner Williams (UCA, Pitcher)
Itchy Burts (TAMUCC, Utility)

Second Team
Preston Faulkner (SELA, 1st Base)
Logan Berlof (LAMR, 2nd Base)
Anthony Quirion (LAMR, 3rd Base)
Reid Bourque (MCNS, Shortstop)
Chris Sandberg (NICH, Catcher)
Lee Thomas (UIW, Designated Hitter)
Josh Ragan (UCA, Outfielder)
Jack Rogers (SHSU, Outfielder)
Tyler Smith (NSU, Outfielder)
John Gaddis (TAMUCC, Pitcher)
Gavin Stone (UCA, Pitcher)
Luke Taggart (UIW, Pitcher)
Jeremy Rodriguez (SFA, Pitcher)
Jake Dickerson (MCNS, Utility)

Roster

Coaching staff

Schedule and results

{| class="toccolours" width=95% style="clear:both; margin:1.5em auto; text-align:center;"
|-
! colspan=2 style="" | 2021 Central Arkansas Bears Baseball Game Log
|-
! colspan=2 style="" | Regular Season (23-28)
|- valign="top"
|

|-
|

|-
|
{| class="wikitable collapsible" style="margin:auto; width:100%; text-align:center; font-size:95%"
! colspan=12 style="padding-left:4em;" | April (6-10)
|-
! Date
! Opponent
! Rank
! Site/Stadium
! Score
! Win
! Loss
! Save
! TV
! Attendance
! Overall Record
! SLC Record
|- align="center" bgcolor=#ffdddd
|Apr. 1 || Sam Houston State || || Bear Stadium • Conway, AR || L 2-3 || Davis (4-1) || Williams (0-1) || Lusk (3) || || 185 || 9-13 || 6-7
|- align="center" bgcolor=#ffdddd
|Apr. 2 || Sam Houston State || || Bear Stadium • Conway, AR || L 0-2 || Robinson (2-1) || Moyer (1-3) || Lusk (4) || || 122 || 9-14 || 6-8
|- align="center" bgcolor=#ffdddd
|Apr. 2 || Sam Houston State || || Bear Stadium • Conway, AR || L 1-3 || Dillard (1-3) || Busey (0-1) || Lusk (5) || || 155 || 9-15 || 6-9
|- align="center" bgcolor=#ffdddd
|Apr. 3 || Sam Houston State || || Bear Stadium • Conway, AR || L 4-10 || Atkinson (3-1) || Gilbertson (1-1) || None || || 258 || 9-16 || 6-10
|- align="center" bgcolor=#dddddd
|Apr. 6 || at Arkansas State || || Tomlinson Stadium–Kell Field • Jonesboro, AR || colspan=12| Game postponed
|- align="center" bgcolor=#dddddd
|Apr. 9 || at No. 14 Oklahoma State || || O'Brate Stadium • Stillwater, OK || colspan=12| Game cancelled
|- align="center" bgcolor=#dddddd
|Apr. 10 || at No. 14 Oklahoma State || || O'Brate Stadium • Stillwater, OK || colspan=12| Game cancelled
|- align="center" bgcolor=#dddddd
|Apr. 11 || at No. 14 Oklahoma State || || O'Brate Stadium • Stillwater, OK || colspan=12| Game cancelled
|- align="center" bgcolor=#ddffdd
|Apr. 14 || Little Rock || || Bear Stadium • Conway, AR || W 4-2 || Moyer (2-3) || Beardsley (0-1) || ' 'Cleveland (5) || || 345 || 10-16 ||
|- align="center" bgcolor=#ffdddd
|Apr. 16 || at Texas A&M–Corpus Christi || || Chapman Field • Corpus Christi, TX || L 4-7 || Ramirez (3-2) || Cleveland (3-3) || None || || 239 || 10-17 || 6-11
|- align="center" bgcolor=#ffdddd
|Apr. 17 || at Texas A&M–Corpus Christi || || Chapman Field • Corpus Christi, TX || L 1-2 || Thomas (2-1) || Moyer (2-4) || Bird (1) || || 197 || 10-18 || 6-12
|- align="center" bgcolor=#ffdddd
|Apr. 18 || at Texas A&M–Corpus Christi || || Chapman Field • Corpus Christi, TX || L 1-5 || Gaddis (2-3) || Gilbertson (1-2) || None || || 167 || 10-19 || 6-13
|- align="center" bgcolor=#ffdddd
|Apr. 18 || at Texas A&M–Corpus Christi || || Chapman Field • Corpus Christi, TX || L 4-10 || Ramirez (4-1) || Busey (0-2) || None || || 167 || 10-20 || 6-14
|- align="center" bgcolor=#ddffdd
|Apr. 20 || Arkansas State || || Bear Stadium • Conway, AR || W 5-3 || Shoultz (1-0) || Albat (0-1) || Cleveland (6) || || 245 || 11-20 ||
|- align="center" bgcolor=#ddffdd
|Apr. 23 || Stephen F. Austin || || Bear Stadium • Conway, AR || W 10-9 (10 inns) || Cleveland (4-3) || Koch (1-1) || None || || 245 || 12-20 || 7-14
|- align="center" bgcolor=#ffdddd
|Apr. 24 || Stephen F. Austin || || Bear Stadium • Conway, AR || L 2-8 || Todd (3-2) || Moyer (2-5) || None || || 325 || 12-21 || 7-15
|- align="center" bgcolor=#ddffdd
|Apr. 25 || Stephen F. Austin || || Bear Stadium • Conway, AR || W 7-6 || Navarro (1-0) || Gauthe (1-2) || None || || 310 || 13-21 || 8-15
|- align="center" bgcolor=#ddffdd
|Apr. 25 || Stephen F. Austin || || Bear Stadium • Conway, AR || W 9-0 || Cleveland (5-3) || Sgambelluri (2-3) || None || || 310 || 14-21 || 9-15
|- align="center" bgcolor=#ffdddd
|Apr. 30 || Northwestern State || || Bear Stadium • Conway, AR || L 4-8 || Harmon (4-2) || Gilbertson (1-3) || Brown (3) || || 295 || 14-22 || 9-16
|- align="center" bgcolor=#ddffdd
|Apr. 30 || Northwestern State || || Bear Stadium • Conway, AR || W 3-1 || Williams (1-1) || Carver (5-4) || Cleveland (7) || || 348 || 15-22 || 10-16
|}
|-
|Schedule Source:*Rankings are based on the team's current ranking in the D1Baseball poll.
|}

Posteason
Conference Accolades 
Player of the Year: Colton Cowser – SHSU
Hitter of the Year: Colton Eager – ACU
Pitcher of the Year: Will Dion – MCNS
Relief Pitcher of the Year: Tyler Cleveland – UCA
Freshman of the Year: Brennan Stuprich – SELA
Newcomer of the Year: Grayson Tatrow – ACU
Clay Gould Coach of the Year: Rick McCarty – ACUAll Conference First TeamChase Kemp (LAMR)
Nate Fisbeck (MCNS)
Itchy Burts (TAMUCC)
Bash Randle (ACU)
Mitchell Dickson (ACU)
Lee Thomas (UIW)
Colton Cowser (SHSU)
Colton Eager (ACU)
Clayton Rasbeary (MCNS)
Will Dion (MCNS)
Brennan Stuprich (SELA)
Will Warren (SELA)Tyler Cleveland (UCA)Anthony Quirion (LAMR)All Conference Second TeamPreston Faulkner (SELA)
Daunte Stuart (NSU)
Kasten Furr (UNO)
Evan Keller (SELA)
Skylar Black (SFA)
Tre Obregon III (MCNS)
Jack Rogers (SHSU)
Pearce Howard (UNO)
Grayson Tatrow (ACU)
Chris Turpin (UNO)
John Gaddis (TAMUCC)
Trevin Michael (LAMR)
Caleb Seroski (UNO)
Jacob Burke (SELA)All Conference Third TeamLuke Marbach (TAMUCC)
Salo Iza (UNO)
Austin Cain (NICH)
Darren Willis (UNO)
Ryan Snell (LAMR)
Tommy Cruz (ACU)
Tyler Finke (SELA)
Payton Harden (MCNS)
Mike Williams (TAMUCC)
Cal Carver (NSU)
Levi David (NSU)
Dominic Robinson (SHSU)
Jack Dallas (LAMR)
Brett Hammit (ACU)All Conference Defensive TeamLuke Marbach (TAMUCC)
Nate Fisebeck (MCNS)
Anthony Quirion (LAMR)
Darren Willis (UNO)
Gaby Cruz (SELA)
Julian Gonzales (MCNS)
Colton Cowser (SHSU)
Avery George (LAMR)
Will Dion (MCNS)References:'''

References

Central Arkansas Bears
Central Arkansas Bears baseball seasons
Central Arkansas Bears baseball